3-Dehydrocarnitine is an aliphatic quaternary ammonium betaine that is part of the carnitine family. At physiological pH of 7.3, the major species of 3-dehydrocarnitine is its zwitterionic form, the conjugate base of 3-dehydrocarnitinium. 3-Dehydrocarnitine is classified as a short-chain keto acid, as it has a carbon chain containing less than six carbon atoms. It is an intermediate in carnitine degradation and is formed from D- or L-carnitine. The enzymes responsible for the degradation of carnitine to 3-dehydrocarnitine are carnitine-3-dehydrogenase or (S)-carnitine-3-dehydrogenase.

Biological role

Role in humans 
3-Dehydrocarnitine has a role as a human metabolite, as it is an intermediate of the degradation of carnitine. Carnitine is utilized in the transport of fatty acids from the cytosol into the mitochondria of living cells during the breakdown of fatty acids for the generation of metabolic energy. In humans, 3-dehydrocarnitine is found in the blood, saliva, urine, and feces. In patients with colorectal cancer, elevated levels of 3-dehydrocarnitine have been detected, possibly due to the elevated rate of metabolism seen in malignant cancer cells.

Presence in other animals 
3-Dehydrocarnitine is also found exogenously in multiple sources of food, such as poultry, lagomorph, sheep, goat, beef, venison, equine, and pork. This indicates its presence in the animals the food is derived from. 3-Dehydrocarnitine is also present in mice and Apis cerana. It is found as a metabolite in aging mouse brains, and is found as a product of Apis cerana.

Role in bacteria 
Bacteria in the genus Pseudomonas are able to aerobically grow on L-carnitine, as it is the bacteria's sole source of nitrogen and carbon. The L-carnitine is metabolized at its beta-hydroxy group by L-carnitine-3-dehydrogenase and the coenzyme NAD+, which forms 3-dehydrocarnitine; the 3-dehydrocarnitine then acts as an inducer for the enzyme, further allowing the enzyme to catalyze the reaction. The formed 3-dehydrocarnitine may also be broken down to form glycine betaine which is then metabolized through step demethylation to form glycine.

See also
 Carnitine
 Carnitine dehydrogenase
 Enzyme
 Metabolism
 Pseudomonas

References 

Ketones
Quaternary ammonium compounds
Zwitterions
Amino acids